Telingana is a genus of membracid tree hoppers found in Asia. They lay solitary eggs and the young do not aggregate as in some membracids. The genus was described by William Lucas Distant in 1908. Several species have been described in the genus including:
 T. balteata Distant, 1916
 T. campbelli Distant, 1916
 T. canescens Buckton, 1903
 T. capistrata Distant, 1908
 T. cognata Distant, 1916
 T. consobrina Distant, 1916
 T. curvispinus Stål, 1869 (genus type)
 T. decipiens Kirby, W.F., 1891
 T. depressa Funkhouser, 1935
 T. flavipes Kirby, W.F., 1891
 T. formosanus Matsumura, 1912
 T. imitator Kirby, W.F., 1891
 T. maculoptera Yuan, 2002
 T. majuscula Thirumalai & Ananthasubramanian, 1981
 T. nigroalata Ananthasubramanian & Ananthakrishnan, 1975
 T. ornanda Distant, 1916
 T. paria Fairmaire, 1846
 T. pulniensis Ananthasubramanian, 1980
 T. recurvata Distant, 1916
 T. sabarigiriensis Thirumalai & Ananthasubramanian, 1985
 T. scutellata China, 1925
 T. subsimilis Walker, 1857
 T. travancorensis Distant, 1916
 T. varipes Walker, 1857

References

External links 
 Genus overview

Membracidae